Troubadour is the twenty-fifth studio album by American country music singer George Strait. It was released on April 1, 2008 (see 2008 in country music) on MCA Nashville Records. The album comprises twelve tracks, including two duets. The lead-off single, "I Saw God Today", was the highest-debuting single of Strait's career, and his forty-third Number One on the Billboard country charts. The album has been certified platinum by the RIAA. At the 51st Grammy Awards, Troubadour earned the Grammy Award for Best Country Album, the first Grammy win of Strait's career. The album was intended to include the song "Everybody Wants to Go to Heaven", but after Strait decided not to include it on the album, it was later recorded by Kenny Chesney, and was released as the first single from his album Lucky Old Sun.  "It Was Me" was originally recorded by Jamey Johnson on his 2006 album, The Dollar.

Singles
"I Saw God Today", the lead-off single, debuted at #19 on the Billboard Hot Country Songs chart, giving Strait the highest chart debut of his career. This song went on to become his 43rd Billboard Number One, and his 56th on all trade charts, setting a new record for most Number One singles. The album's title track was released in June 2008 as its second single, and peaked at #7 on the country charts. Following it was "River of Love", which debuted at #45 in November 2008, and reached #1 in April 2009.

Critical reception

Rhapsody ranked the album #4 on its "Country's Best Albums of the Decade" list. "With a career that includes an awe-inspiring 50-plus No. 1 hits, plenty of George Strait's releases could have a spot on this list, but Troubadour feels like the best fit. From the Caribbean lilt of "River of Love" to the reverential "I Saw God Today" to the honky-tonkin' trucking song "Brothers of the Highway" to the carefree Western swing of "West Texas Town", Strait runs the gamut of sounds and emotions, and aces them all. One of the few artists who can achieve commercial success without courting it, Strait remains true to the honky-tonk-inspired sound he started out with decades ago."

Track listing

Personnel
 Eddie Bayers – drums
 Billy Burnette – background vocals
 Shawn Camp – background vocals
 Dean Dillon – duet vocals on "West Texas Town"
 Stuart Duncan – fiddle, mandolin
 Thom Flora – background vocals
 Paul Franklin – pedal steel guitar
 Steve Gibson – acoustic guitar, electric guitar, gut string guitar
 Vince Gill – background vocals
 Wes Hightower – background vocals
 Patty Loveless – duet vocals on "House of Cash"
 Mac McAnally – acoustic guitar
 Brent Mason – electric guitar
 Dennis Morgan – background vocals
 Steve Nathan – Hammond organ, piano, synthesizer
 Matt Rollings – Hammond organ, piano, Wurlitzer
 Marty Slayton – background vocals
 George Strait – lead vocals
 Glenn Worf – bass guitar

Charts

Weekly charts

Year-end charts

References

2008 albums
George Strait albums
MCA Records albums
Albums produced by Tony Brown (record producer)
Grammy Award for Best Country Album